Obererbach is an Ortsgemeinde – a community belonging to a Verbandsgemeinde – in the Westerwaldkreis in Rhineland-Palatinate, Germany.

Geography

The community lies in the Westerwald between Montabaur and Limburg an der Lahn. It belongs to the Verbandsgemeinde of Wallmerod, a kind of collective municipality. Its seat is in the like-named town.

History
In 1290, Obererbach had its first documentary mention as Erlebach.

Politics

The municipal council is made up of 12 council members who were elected in a majority vote in a municipal election on 13 June 2004.

Economy and infrastructure

Running right through the community is Kreisstraße 160, which joins Bundesstraße 8 in Malmeneich. The nearest Autobahn interchange is Montabaur on the A 3 (Cologne–Frankfurt), some 7 km away. The nearest InterCityExpress stop is the railway station at Montabaur on the Cologne-Frankfurt high-speed rail line.

References

External links
 Obererbach 

Westerwaldkreis